André Rankel (born 27 August 1985 in West Berlin, West Germany) is a German professional ice hockey forward. He is currently an unrestricted free agent who most recently played for the Eisbären Berlin in the Deutsche Eishockey Liga (German Ice Hockey League). He began playing in the DEL in 2003 with Berlin.

Rankel has also played internationally for the German national team. He was selected to play for Germany's team at the 2010 Winter Olympics. He has previously represented Germany at the 2003 and 2004 IIHF World U18 Championships, the 2005 World Junior Championship, and the 2007, 2008, and 2009 Ice Hockey World Championships.

Career statistics

Regular season and playoffs

International

References

External links
 

1985 births
Eisbären Berlin players
German ice hockey left wingers
Ice hockey people from Berlin
Ice hockey players at the 2010 Winter Olympics
Living people
Olympic ice hockey players of Germany